This list of museums on the Isle of Wight, England contains museums which are defined for this context as institutions (including nonprofit organizations, government entities, and private businesses) that collect and care for objects of cultural, artistic, scientific, or historical interest and make their collections or related exhibits available for public viewing. Also included are non-profit art galleries and university art galleries.  Museums that exist only in cyberspace (i.e., virtual museums) are not included.

Defunct
 Arreton Manor, now closed to the public
 The Brading Experience, also known as the Isle of Wight Waxworks, website
 Dinosaur Farm Museum, Brighstone
 Isle of Wight Coastal Visitors Centre, Ventnor
Sunken Secrets now Shipwreck Centre and Maritime Museum at Arreton

See also
 List of beaches of the Isle of Wight
 List of tourist attractions in the Isle of Wight

References

Local Life: Isle of Wight Museums
Isle of Wight Heritage Service - Museum Service

 
Isle of Wight
Museums